The Latvian Baseball Federation (LBF) is the governing body for the amateur league of baseball in Latvia. LBF was founded in 2009 and has been governing one league.

LBF is a member of the Confederation of European Baseball (CEB), and is responsible for the national baseball team for the European Baseball Championship and Latvian Baseball League

External links 
 Latvian Baseball Federation (LBF) official website

Baseball
Baseball in Latvia
Baseball governing bodies in Europe